The 2002 Winter Paralympics ice sledge hockey tournament was held from 8 March to 15 March 2002 at the E Center in West Valley City, Utah, United States.

Final rankings

Preliminary round
All times are local (UTC-7).

Final round

Fifth place game

Bronze medal game

Gold medal game

Awards and statistics 
 Scoring leader:  Sylvester Flis 18 points (11 goals, 7 assists)
 Best scorer:  Sylvester Flis (11 goals)
 MVP:  Sylvester Flis
 All-Star Team

See also
 2000 IPC Ice Sledge Hockey World Championships in Salt Lake City

External links
 Official site of the 2002 Paralympic Winter Games
 Meet The Teams
 2002 Paralympic Winter Games - Ice Sledge Hockey Results

2002 Winter Paralympics events
Paralympics, Winter
2002
2002